The women's 48 kg competition at the 2021 European Judo Championships was held on 16 April at the Altice Arena.

Results

Final

Repechage

Top half

Bottom half

References

External links
 

W48
European Judo Championships Women's Extra Lightweight
European W48